David W. Stratas (born 1960) is a Canadian jurist.  He has served on the Federal Court of Appeal since 2009 and the Court Martial Appeal Court of Canada since 2012.

Biography 
David W. Stratas was born in 1960 in Toronto, Ontario.

Stratas was educated at Queen's University, earning an LL.B. in 1984 and Oxford University, earning a B.C.L. in 1986.  He then returned to Canada and clerked for Justice Bertha Wilson of the Supreme Court of Canada. He proceeded to practise law as a litigator at Toronto law firms, including Osler, Hoskin & Harcourt and Heenan Blaikie.

From 1994 until his appointment to the Federal Court of Appeal in 2009, he served as an adjunct professor at Queen's Law School.

References

1960 births
Judges of the Federal Court of Appeal (Canada)
Judges of the Court Martial Appeal Court of Canada
Lawyers in Ontario
Living people
People from Toronto
Queen's University at Kingston alumni
Queen's University Faculty of Law alumni